Beiwei (北魏) may refer to:

Northern Wei (386–535), a dynasty in North China during the Northern and Southern Dynasties period
Beiwei Township, a township in Dacheng County, Hebei, China